"Up & Down" is a song by English singer Eddy Huntington from his debut studio album, Bang Bang Baby (1989).

Track listing 

 Italian 7-inch single

A. "Up & Down (Vocal)" – 3:23
B. "Up & Down (Instrumental)" – 3:56

 Italian 12-inch single

A. "Up & Down" – 6:33
B. "Down and Up (Instrumental)" – 5:00

Credits and personnel 

 Eddy Huntington – vocals
 Tom Hooker – songwriter
 Michele Chieregato – songwriter, producer
 Roberto Turatti – songwriter, producer
 Franco Zorzi – mixing

Credits and personnel adopted from the Bang Bang Baby album and 7-inch single liner notes.

Charts

References

External links 

 

1987 songs
1987 singles
Eddy Huntington songs
ZYX Music singles